The Old Water and Electric Light Plant, (later known as the Holly Springs Police Department), is a historic building in Holly Springs, Mississippi, U.S.. It was built from 1897 to 1898, with the aim of attracting more businesses to Holly Springs. By 1899, after water pipes had been laid out, 100 houses in Holly Springs had running water. The building was later used as the police department headquarters in Holly Springs. It has been listed on the National Register of Historic Places since June 28, 1982.

References

National Register of Historic Places in Marshall County, Mississippi
Energy infrastructure completed in 1898
1898 establishments in Mississippi
Police headquarters
Water supply infrastructure on the National Register of Historic Places
Energy infrastructure on the National Register of Historic Places